Calhoun County Airport  is a county-owned public-use airport in Calhoun County, Mississippi, United States. It is located one nautical mile (1.15 mi, 1.85 km) southwest of the central business district of Pittsboro, Mississippi. The airport is included in the FAA's National Plan of Integrated Airport Systems for 2011–2015, which categorized it as a general aviation facility.

Facilities and aircraft 
It has one runway designated 15/33 with an asphalt surface measuring 3,200 by 60 feet (975 x 18 m). For the 12-month period ending February 15, 2011, the airport had 5,820 general aviation aircraft operations, an average of 15 per day.

References

External links 
 Aerial image as of February 1996 from USGS The National Map
 

Airports in Mississippi
Buildings and structures in Calhoun County, Mississippi
Transportation in Calhoun County, Mississippi